Wysoka  is a village in the administrative district of Gmina Przemków, within Polkowice County, Lower Silesian Voivodeship, in south-western Poland. 

The village has a population of 331.

References

Wysoka